India was the host nation for the 1982 Asian Games held at Delhi, India from 19 November to 4 December 1982. Ranked 5th with 13 gold medals, 19 silver medals and 25 bronze medals with a total of 57 over-all medals.

Medals by sport

Gold Medal Winners
Charles Borromeo (athlete) - Men's 800m;
MD Valsamma - Women's 400m hurdles;
Chand Ram - Men's 20 km walk;
Bahadur Singh Chouhan - Men's Shot Put;
Raghubir Singh - Men's Equestrian;
Rupi Brar - Equestrian Tent Pegging;
Men's Equestrian Team;
Men's Golf Team;
Bunny Lakshman Singh - Men's Golf;
Satpal Singh - Wrestling, Heavyweight;
Kaur Singh - Boxing, Heavyweight;
Women's Hockey Team;
Tarapore and Karanja - Sailing, Enterprise Class;

References

Nations at the 1982 Asian Games
1982
Asian Games